(not to be confused with the Sequoyah Council located in Tennessee and Virginia)

The Sequoia Council serves Fresno, Madera, Kings and Tulare Counties in California. Founded in 1919 as the Fresno Council, it changed its name to Sequoia  Council in 1925. In 1992, the  Mount Whitney Area Council (#054) merged into Sequoia. The council was the first in California to sponsor an all girl cub scout pack.

Organization
San Joaquin District
Thunderbird District
Riverbend District
Live Oak District

Camps
Camp Chawanakee

Order of the Arrow
 Tah-Heetch Lodge #195

Notable Scouts and Supporters
 Amanda Bales of Clovis became the first female to become an Eagle Scout in the council.
 Bob Ludekens of Visalia was depicted in the 1947 Norman Rockwell painting "All Together".
 Leon S Peters of Fresno President of the Central California War Industries company during the second world war.

See also
Scouting in California

References

Organizations based in Fresno, California
1919 establishments in California
Boy Scout councils in California